This is a list of compositions by Carl Loewe.

Piano

Piano solo
Abendfantasie, Op. 11 (1817)
Grande Sonate in E Major, Op. 16 (1829)
Mazeppa (Ballade ohne Worte), Op. 27 (1828)
Der barmherzige Bruder, Op. 28 (1830)
Grande Sonate élégiaque in F minor, Op. 32
Grande Sonate brillante, Op. 41 (1819)
Der Frühling (Eine Tondichtung in Sonatenform), Op. 47 (1824)
Alpenfantasie, Op. 53 (1835)
Biblische Bilder, Op. 96 (1844)
Zigeuner-Sonate, Op. 107b (1847)
Vier Phantasien, Op. 137

Piano, four hands
Grosses Duo, for piano four hands, Op. 18

Chamber music

Clarinet and piano
Schottische Bilder, Op. 112 (ca. 1847)

Violin and piano
Grand Duo, Op. 90

Viola and piano
Duo Espagnôla [sic] (1857, pub. by Cord Garden in 2018)

Piano trio
Grand Trio in G minor, Op. 12 (1821, pub. 1830, new edition by Cord Garden in 2018)

String quartet
String Quartet in G major, Op. 24/1 (1821)
String Quartet in F major, Op. 24/2 (1821)
String Quartet in B-flat major, Op. 24/3 (1821)
String Quartet in C minor, Op. 26 'Quatuor spirituel' (1830)

Orchestral

Symphonies
Symphony in E minor (1834, in manuscript, pub. by Cord Garden in 2018)
Symphony in D minor (ca.1835, in manuscript, pub. by Cord Garden in 2018)

Piano and orchestra
Piano Concerto in E minor
Piano Concerto in A major (ca.1830, in manuscript, pub. by Cord Garden in 2018)

Incidental music
Das Märchen im Traum (Ernst Raupach), 1832?
includes Overture in D minor (a manuscript scan is available on IMSLP)

Opera
Die Alpenhütte (The Alpine Cabin), singspiel, 1 act (August von Kotzebue), first perf. 1816, Berlin
Rudolf der deutsche Herr (Rudolph, the German Lord), grand romantic opera, 3 acts (Loewe and Vocke), 1825, unperformed
Malekadhel (Malek-Adhel), grand tragic opera, 3 acts (Caroline Pichler, after The Talisman by Walter Scott), first perf. 1832, Berlin
Neckereien (Teasing), comic opera, 3 acts, E.A. Mühlbach), 1833, unperformed
Die drei Wünsche (The Three Wishes), Op. 42, singspiel, 3 acts (Ernst Raupach), first perf. 2 or 18 Feb 1834, Berlin, Schauspielhaus; recorded 1996/1998
Emmy, romantic opera, 3 acts (Franz Ludwig Melzer and Fr. von Hauser, after Kenilworth by Walter Scott), 1842, unperformed

Choral Music

Oratorios
Die Zestörung von Jerusalem (Die Zerstörung Jerusalems), Op. 30 (G. Nicolai), 1829 (perf. in Stettin, 1829; pub. 1821, Leipzig)
Die sieben Schläfer, Op. 46 (Ludwig Giesebrecht), 1833 (pub. Mainz, 1835)
Die eherne Schlange, Op. 40 (Ludwig Giesebrecht), 1834 (pub. Berlin, 1834),  male chorus
Die Apostel von Philippi, Op. 48 (Ludwig Giesebrecht), 1835 (pub. Berlin, 1835), male chorus
Gutenberg, Op. 55  (Ludwig Giesebrecht), 1836 (pub. Mainz, 1836)
Die Festzeiten, Op. 66 (Bible: John), 1825–36 (pub. Mainz, 1842)
Palestrina (Ludwig Giesebrecht), 1841
Johann Hus, Op. 82 (A. Zeune), 1842 (pub. Berlin, 1842)
Der Meister von Avis (Ludwig Giesebrecht), 1843
Das Sühnopfer des neuen Bundes, Passionsoratium (von Telschow), 1847
Hiob (Job) (von Telschow), 1848
Das hohe Lied von Salomonis (Ludwig Giesebrecht), 1859
Polus von Atella (Ludwig Giesebrecht), 1860
Die Heilung des Blindgeborenen, Op. 131 (Bible: John 9), (pub. Magdeburg, 1860)
Johannes der Täufer (Gospels), 1862
Die Auferweckung des Lazarus, Op. 132 (Bible: John 11), (pub. Brunswick, 1863)
Der Segen von Assisi, unfinished

Other sacred
Te Deum, Op. 77, for chorus and orchestra (pub. Berlin, 1842)
Salvum fac regem, for a cappella choir (pub. Berlin, 1853)
Komm, Gott Schöpfer (Easter cantata)
4 Weihnachts-Responsorien, for 8 voices, 1859
6 psalms
Der Herr ist mein Hirte (Psalm 23), Op. 100, for male a cappella choir (pub. Dresden, 1845)
Die Hülfe mein vom Herren kommt (Psalm 121), Op. 101, for male a cappella choir (pub. Dresden, 1845)
Psalm 33, for male a cappella choir (pub. Dresden, 1845)
Schaffe in mir Gott (Psalm 51), for male a cappella choir, 1849
Höre Gott (Psalm 61), for a cappella choir, 1850
Psalm 65.3, for a cappella choir
3 motets
Motette (Bible: Lamentations 3.22–8), for a cappella choir, 1866?
Motette zum Bibelfeste (Bible: Hebrews 4.12), for male a cappella choir
Motette zur Einweihung des Taubstummen-Instituts, for a cappella choir

Lieder
Edward, Op. 1/1 [1818, publ. 1824]
Der Wirthin Töchterlein, Op. 1/2: “Es zogen drei Bursche wohl über den Rhein” [1823, publ. 1824]
Erlkönig, Op. 1/3 [publ. 1824]
Treuröschen, Op. 2/1 [1814, publ. 1824]
Herr Oluf, Op. 2/2 [1821, publ. 1824]
Walpurgisnacht, Op. 2/3: “Liebe Mutter, Heut' Nacht Heulte Regend Und Wind” [1824]
Abschied, Op. 3/1 [1825]
Elvershöh, Op. 3/2 [1825]
Die Drei Lieder, Op. 3/3 [1825]
Herodes Klage um Marianne, Op. 4/1 [1823, publ. 1825]
An den Wassern zu Babel Op. 4/2:  "An Babylons Wassern gefangen" [1823, publ. 1825]
Wär' ich wirklich so falsch?, Op. 4/3 [1823, publ. 1825]
Alles ist eitel, spricht der Prediger, Op. 4/4 “Es waren Ruhm und Weisheit mein” [1823, publ. 1825]
Todtenklage, Op. 4/5 [1823, publ. 1825]
Thränen und Lächeln, Op. 4/6 [1823, publ. 1825]
Sie geht in Schönheit, Op. 5 H.II,1:
Jephta’s Tochter, Op. 5/2: “Soll nach des Volkes und nach Gottes Willen”
Die wilde Gazelle, Op. 5/3
Hebräische Gesänge II, Op. 5/4: “Weint um Israel”
Mein Geist Ist Trub, Op. 5/5 “Mein Geist Ist Trub: Den Ton Der Saiten”
Saul vor seiner letzten Schlacht, Op. 5/6
Wallhaide, Op. 6: “Wo Dort Die Alten Gemauer Stehn” [1819, publ. 1826]
Der große Kurfürst und die Spreejungfrau ('Die Nacht ist so dunkel, der Sturm so laut'), Op. 7/1
Der Spate Gast, Op. 7/2: “Was Klopft Ans Thor?”
Goldschmieds Töchterlein, Op. 8/1
Der Mutter Geist, Op. 8/2
Das Standchen, Op. 9: “Was Wecken Aus Dem Schlummer Mich”
Turmwächter Lynceus zu dem Füßen der Helena Op. 9 H.I: “Laß mich knien, laß mich schaue”
Lynceus, der Helena seine Schätze darbietend, Op. 9 H.I:
Lynceus, der Türmer, auf Faust's Sternwarte singend, Op. 9, H.I:
Neuer Frühling Herz, sei nicht beklommen, Op. 9 H.I:
Die Lotosblume ängstigt sich, Op. 9 H.I,1:
Im Traum sah ich die Geliebte, Op. 9 H.I,2:
Der König auf dem Thurme, Op. 9 H.I,2b:
Wandrers Nachlied, Op. 9 H.1,3a
Wandrers Nachtlied, Op. 9, H.1,3b
Erste Liebe Sie liebten sich beide, doch keiner, Op. 9, H.I,4:
Geisterleben, Op. 9 H.I,4b:
Du schönes Fischermädcchen, Op. 9 H.I,5:
Die Elfenkönigin, Op. 9 H.I,5b:
Ich hab' im Traum geweinet, Op. 9 H.I,6:
Lied Der Desdemona, Op. 9 H.II,2: “Die Arme, Wie Seufzend Am Ahorn Sass Sie!”
Die Abgeschiedenen, Op. 9 H.II,3:
Die Jungfrau und der Tod (Wie ist so heiss im Busen mir), Op. 9 H. II,5:
Ich denke dein, Op. 9 H.III,1:
Meine Ruh' ist hin, Op. 9 H.III,2:
Der Treuergebene, Op. 9 H.III,4:
Sehnsucht ('Nur wer die Schnsucht kennt, weiß, was ich leide'), Op. 9 H.III,5:
Wenn du wärst mein eigen Op. 9, H.IV,1:
Abschied, Op. 9 H.IV,2:
Fruhlingserwachen, Op.9 H.IV,3: “Es Schauet Der Morgen Mit Funkelndem Schein”
Ihr Spaziergang, Op. 9 H.IV,4:
Graf Eberhards Weißdorn, Op. 9 H.IV,5:
Minnelied, Op. 9 H.V,1:
Bauernregel, Op. 9 H.V,3:
Die Zufriedenen, Op. 9 H.V,4:
An die fleissige Spinnerin, Op. 9 H.V,5:
Liebesgedanken, Op. 9, H.VI,2:
Wach auf!, Op. 9 H.VI,1:
Vogelgesang, Op. 9, H.VI,3:
Graf Eberstein, Op. 9 H.VI,5:
An die Geliebte, Op. 9, H.VII,3:
Madchenwunsche, Op. 9 H.VIII,4: “O Fande Fur Mich Ein Brautigam Sich, Wie Schon Ware Es Da!”
Gutmann und Gutweib, Op. 9, H.VIII,5
Szene aus Faust ('Ach neige, du Schmerzensreiche'), Op. 9 H.IX,1
Der alte Goethe, Op. 9 H.IX,2: “Als ich ein junger Geselle war”
Die verliebte Schäferin Scapine, Op. 9 H.IX,3:
An Aphrodite, Op. 9 H.IX,4:
An die Grille, Op. 9 H.IX,5:
Die Fernen,Op. 9 H.IX,6:
Die Sylphide, Op. 9 H.X,2: “Liebes Leichtes Luft'ges Ding, Schmetterling!”
Der Bräutigam, Op. 9 H.X,3:
Niemand Hat's Gesehn, Op. 9 H.X,4: “Die Trepp, Hinuntergeschwungen Komm Ich In Vollem Lauf”
Mädchen sind wie der Wind, Op. 9/4
Der verschmachtende pilger,  Op. 10 H.1,2
Melek in der Wüste,  Op. 10 H.1,3
Die Oasis (Wie lockt der Palmen grünes Dach), Op. 10 H. I,4:
Lied eines Vögeleins in der Oasis (Ich schaukle leicht mich im grünen Laub), Op. 10, H. I,5:
Maisuna am Brunnen (Ihr habt genug getrunken), Op. 10 H. II,1:
Ali und Fatme (Deine Stimme lass ertönen), Op. 10 H. II/2:
Assad mit dem Selam, Op. 10, H.II,3:
Taubenpost Op. 10 H.II,4: “Ein Täubchen bringt mir täglich Grüße”
Gulhinde am Putztische ("Reich' mir den Schleier, Emina"), Op. 10 H. II,5
Abendgesang ('Lege den Schmuck nun an, schöne Gulhinde'), Op. 10 H.II,6
Melek und Maisuna, Op. 10/6: “Melek am Quell”
Sanheribs Niederlage, Op. 13/1
Belsazars Gesicht, Op. 13/2
Jordans Ufer, Op. 13/4: “Auf Jordan's Ufer streifen wilde Horden”
Wohin, o Seele wirst du eilen?, Op. 13/5
Die Sonne Der Schlaflosen, Op. 13/6 “Schlafloser Augen Sonne, Zitternd Licht”
Saul und Samuel, Op. 14/1
Eliphas' Gesicht, Op. 14/2
Saul, Op. 14/4
Jerusalems Zerstörung durch Titus, Op. 14/5
Serbischer Liederkreis, op.15
Mädchen und Rose, Op. 15/1
Beim Tanz (Trallalla, mein Liebchen), Op. 15/2
Überraschung (Komm, o Bruder, in die helle Sonne), Op. 15/3
Des Jünglings Segen (Singt ein Falk' all die Nacht durch), Op. 15/4
Liebesliedchen (Winter vorbei, Herzchen, mein Liebchen), Op. 15/5
Kapitulation (Hinterm Berge dort, dem grünen), Op. 15/6
Hochzeitslied, Op. 20/1
Der Zauberlehrling, Op. 20/2
Die wandelnde Glocke, Op. 20/3
Die Gruft der Liebenden, Op. 21
Die Nächtliche Heerschau, Op. 23
Die Braut Von Corinth, Op. 29: Nach Corinthus Von Athen Gezogen
Jungfrau Lorenz,Op. 33/1
Das heilige Haus in Loretto, Op. 33/2
Des Fremden Kindes Heiliger Christ, Op. 33/3 “Es Lauft Ein Fremdes Kind Am Abend Vor Weihnachten”
Der grosse Christoph, Op. 34
St. Johannes und das Würmlein (Johannes ging am hellen Bach), Op. 35/1
Johann von Nepomuk, Op. 35/2
Maria Und Das Milmadchen, Op. 36/1 “Maria Kam Auf Flucht Gen Mittag In Ein Odes Thal”
Sankt Mariens Ritter, Op. 36/2
Der ewige Jude, Op. 36/3
Das Muttesgottesbild Im Teiche, Op. 37/1 “Im schonen Land Tirol Hab Ich Mir Lassen Sagen”
Moosroslein, Op. 37/2 “In Tiefster Schlucht, In Waldesschoss”
Gregor Auf dem Stein, Op. 38
1: “Herolde ritten von Ort zu Ort”
2: “Im Schloß, da brennen der Kerzen viel”
3: “Der junge König und sein Gemahl”
4: “Ein Klippeneiland liegt im Meer”
5: “Wie bräutlich glänzt das heilige Rom”
Der Bergmann, Op. 39
1: “Im Schacht der Adern und der Stufen”
2: “Von meines Hauses engen Wänden”
3: “Unser Herzog hat herrliche Taten vollbracht”
4: “Es steht ein Kelch in der Kapelle”
5: “Als Weibesarm in jungen Jahren”
Der Fischer, Op. 43/1
Der Räuber Einst am schönen Frühlingsmorgen, Op. 43/2
Das nussbraune Mädchen, Op. 43/3
Ballade vom Vertriebenen und zurüchkehrenden Grafen Op. 44
1: “Herein, o du Guter! du Alter herein!"
2:Der getreue Eckart, Op. 44
3: Der Totentanz, Op. 44
Harald, Op. 45/1
Der Gott und die Bajadere, Op. 45/2
3 Polish Ballads, Op. 49 (1835) 
1: "Czaty" (The Voivode) (Text Adam Mickiewicz, trans. von Blankensee)
2: "Piérwiosnek" (The Primrose) (Text Adam Mickiewicz, trans. von Blankensee)
3: "Trzech Badrysów" (The Three Budrises) (Text Adam Mickiewicz, trans. von Blankensee)
2 Polish Ballads, Op. 50 (1835) 
1: "Wilija i dziewica" (Wilia and the maid) (Text Adam Mickiewicz, trans. von Blankensee), Op. 50/1 H.2,1
2: "Panicz i sziewczyna" (The young man and the maid) (Text Adam Mickiewicz, trans. von Blankensee), Op. 50/2 H.2,2
Switezianka (The Svitez maid), for voice & piano, (Text Adam Mickiewicz, trans. von Blankensee), Op. 51, H.3,1 (1835)
Pani Twardowska (Mrs. Twardowska) (Text Adam Mickiewicz, trans. von Blankensee), Op. 51, H.3,2 (1835)
Esther, Op. 52
1: Wie früh das enge Pförtchen knarre
2: Der König auf dem gold'nen Stuhle
3: Nun auf dem fremden Boden mehret
4: Spielt, Mägdlein, unter euer Weide
5: Wie wohnst du in des Reiches Städten
Der Sturm von Alhama ('Durch die Strassen von Granada'), Op. 54
Heinrich der Vogler, Op. 56/1: “Herr Heinrich sitzt am Vogelherd”
Der Gesang, Op. 56/2
Urgrossvaters Gesellschaft, Op. 56/3
Paria, Op. 58
1: Gebet des Paria ("Großer Brahma, Herr der Mächte!")
2: Legende ("Wasser holen geht die reine")
3: Dank des Paria ("Grosser Brahma! nun erkenn ich")
Wirkung In Die Ferne, Op. 59
1: “Die Konigin Steht Im Hohen Saal”
2: Der Sänger
3. Der Schatzgräber
Frauenliebe, Op. 60
1: “Seit Ich Ihn Gesehen”
2: “Er, Der Herrlichste Von Allen”
3: “Ich Kann's Nicht Fassen, Nicht Glauben”
4: “Du Ring An Meinem Finger”
5: “Helft Mir, Ihr Schwestern”
6: “Süßer Freund, Du Blickest Mich verwundert An”
7: “An Meinem Herzen, An Meiner Brust”
8: “Nun Hast Du Mir Den Ersten Schmerz Getan”
9: “Traum Der Eignen Tage”
Fridericus Rex, Op. 61/1: “Fridericus Rex, unser König und Herr”
General Schwerin, Op. 61/2
Liederkreis nach Gedichten von Friedrich Rückert, Op. 62 [1837]
1 “Zeislein”
2 “Bescheidung”
3 “O Susse Mutter”
4 “Süßes Begräbnis”
5 “Hinkende Jamben”
6 “Irrlichter”
7 “Abendlied”
8 “In der Kirche”
9 “Ich und mein Gevatter”
10 “Die Pfarrjungferchen”
11 “Kind und Mädchen”
12 “Die Blume der Ergebung”
Die Schneeflock, Op. 63/1
Der Lappländer, Op. 63/2
Fabellieder, Op. 64/1, “Der verliebte Maikäfer Glürmchen, steck's Laternchen an !”
Fabellieder, Op. 64/2: “Der Kuckuck (Aus: >>Ausbund Schöner und wweltlicheeer und züchtiger Lieder<<) Einmal in eine”
Fabellieder, Op. 64/3: “Die Katzenkönigin”
Wer ist Bär?, Op. 64/4
Das Vergessene Lied, Op. 65/1 “Maria Stizt Und Stimmet Die Harfe Zum Gesang”
Das Erkennen, Op. 65/2
Karl der Grosse und Wittekind, Op. 65/3
Napoleonsballaden, Op. 66/1. Der Feldherr (O lass, Geliebter, dich erflehen)
Der Feldherr, Op. 67/1
Die Glocken zu Speier, Op. 67/2
Landgraf Ludwig, Op. 67/3
Schwalbenmärchen Auf dem stillen, schwülen Pfuhle, Op. 68/1
Der Edelfalk, Op. 68/2
Der Blumen Rache, Op. 68/3 “Auf Des Lagers Weichem Kissen Ruht Die Jungfrau”
Nachgelassene Gedichte, Op. 69/1: “Gruß an Züllchow”
Nachgelassene Gedichte, Op. 69/3: “Abendgebet”
Nachgelassene Gedichte, Op. 69/4: “Die Sterne (Welch Leuchten auf den Wogen)”
Nachgelassene Gedichte, Op. 69/5: “Kerzen und Augen”
Nachgelassene Gedichte, Op. 69/6: “Der Komet”
Feuersgedanken, Op. 70
Kleiner Haushalt, Op. 71
Die Göttin im Putzzimmer, Op. 73
Die Zugvögel, Op. 74
Das Grab zu Ephesus, Op. 75/1: Die Einladung (Ein frommer Landmann in der Kirche sass)
Der Weichdorn ('Als Maria heut' entwich'), Op. 75/2
Der heilige Franziskus, Op. 75/3
Das Wunder auf der Flucht Auf jener Flucht, von welcher nun Op. 75/4
Die Einladung, Op. 76/1
Scholastica, Op. 76/2
Te Deum, Op. 77
Jungfräulein Annika ("Welche chaotisch Haushälterei"), Op. 78/1
Die verlorene Tochter, Op. 78/2
Ganymed, Op. 81/5 “Wie Im Morgenglanze Du Rings Mich Angluhst”
Die Heinzelmännchen, Op. 83
Mahomet's Gesang, Op. 85
Mein Herz, Ich Will Dich Fragen, Op. 86 “Mein Herz, Ich Will Dich Fragen, Was Ist Denn Liebe?”
Gesang der Geister über den Wassern, for soprano, alto, tenor, bass, and piano, Op. 88 (1840)
Das Glockenspiel der Phantasie, for voice & piano, Op. 89/1
Dein Auge, for voice & piano, Op. 89/2
Allmacht Gottes (Blättlein so fein und rund), Op. 89/3
Des Mädchens Wunsch und Geständnis (O nimm mich an als deine Magd!), Op. 89/4
Du Geist der reinsten Güte, for voice & orchestra, Op. 89/5
Mit jedem Pulsschlag leb' ich dir, for voice & piano, Op. 89/6
Prinz Eugen, Op. 92
Meerfahrt, Op. 93
Die Schwarzen Augen, Op. 94/2
Alpin's Klage um Morar, Op. 95
Der Mohrenfürst, Op. 97/1
Die Mohrenfürstin, Op. 97/2
Der Mohrenfürst auf der Messe, Op. 97/3
Der Graf Von Habsburg, Op. 98
Das Wiegenfest zu Gent, Op. 99/1 "Es steht eine goldne Wiege am Fuß des Herrscherthrons"
Kaiser Karl in Wittenberg, Op. 99/2
Der Pilgrim vor St. Just, Op. 99/3
Die Leiche zu St. Just, Op. 99/4 “Aus Sankt Justi Klosterhallen tönt ein träges Totenlied”
GruB vom Meere Op. 103/1 “Sei Mir Gegrüsst in Deiner Pracht”
Menschenlose, Op. 103/2
Deutsche Barcarole, Op. 103/3
Tod Und Todin, Op. 105: “Wer Ist So Spat Noch Fleissig Wach?”
Die Reigerbaize, Op.106: “Als Lenz Die Erde Wieder Mit Erstem Kuss Umscholss”
Mondlicht, Op. 107a/1
Alles in dir, Op. 107a/2
Frühling, Op. 107a/3
Die Kaiserjagd im Wienerwald, Op. 108/1
Hueska, Op. 108/2
Der Verfallene Mühle, Op. 109
Am Klosterbrunnen, Op.110/1
Wolkenbild, Op. 110/2
Der Papagei, Op. 111
Des Glockentürmers Töchterlein, Op. 112a
Der Mönch Zu Pisa, Op. 114
Der Gefangene Admiral, Op. 115: “’s Sind Heut Dreiunddreissig Jahr”
Die Dorfkirche In einem Dorf am frühen Morgen, Op. 116/1
Der alte König, Op. 116/2
Der Mummelsee,Op. 116/3
Odins Meeresritt, Op. 118
Elvershöh, Op.118/2
Lied der Königin Elisabeth, Op. 119
Die Begegnung am Meeresstrande, Op. 120
Kaiser Otto's Weihnachtsfeier Op. 121/1
Der Drachenfels, Op. 121/2
Waffenweihe Kaiser Heinrich’s IV, Op. 122
Sängers Gebet, Op. 123/1: “Du, der Du bist der Geister Hort”
Die Uhr, Op. 123/2
Trommel Ständchen, Op. 123
Der lezte Ritter, “Max in Augsburg”, Op. 124/1
Der lezte Ritter, “Max und Dürer”, Op. 124/2
Der lezte Ritter, “Abschied” Op. 124/3
Landgraf Philipp der Großmütige, Op. 125/1
Der alte Schiffsherr, Op. 125/2
Sanct Helena (Der Verbannte), Op. 126
Der kleine Schiffer ("Die Königstochter sticket"), Op. 127
Archibald Douglas, Op. 128
Der Teufel (Und als der Mensch geschaffen war)Op. 129/1
Der Nöck, Op. 129/2
Die Schwanenjungfrau, Op. 129/3
Liedergabe, Op. 130/1: “Die Waldkapelle”
Liedergabe, Op. 130/2: “Abendstunde”
Liedergabe, Op. 130/3: Die Herzensrose ("Mein Gemüthe blühte gleich der frischen Maienrose")
Liedergabe, Op. 130/4: “Der Hirt auf der Brücke”
Liedergabe, Op. 130/5: Frühlingsankunft ("Es ist mein Herz verengt, verdorrt")
Der Asra, Op. 133: “Täglich ging die wunderschöne Sultanstochter auf und nieder”
Agnete, Op. 134/1: “Es schaute in die Wogen die Maid im Abendschein”
Agnete, Op. 134/2: “Sie stürzt dem Neck zu Füssen”
Agnete, Op. 134/3: “Sie ist herauf gestiegen aus der kristallnen Gruft”
Agnete, Op. 134/4: “Und heller und heller quollen die Hymnen, der Orgel Sang”
Tom der Reimer, Op. 135a
Nebo, Op. 136
Die Gottesmauer, Op. 140: O Mutter, Wie Sturmen Die Flocken Vom Himmel
Der Selt’ne Beter (Der Alte Dessauer), Op. 141 “Im Abengolde Glänzet zu Bärenberg das Schloss”
Der Traum Der Witwe, Op. 142: In Basra Eine Wittwe War Mit Ihren Beiden Sohnen
Spirito Santo, Op. 143: In Des Sudens Heissen Zonen Blumen Giebt  Es kostlich Schon
Meeresleuchten, Op. 145/1: “Wieviel Sonnenstrahlen fielen golden schwer”
Der Feind, Op. 145/2: “Der Adler lauscht auf seinem Horst”
Im Sturme, Op. 145/3: “Bangt dir, mein Lieb?”
Heimlichkeit Op. 145/4: “Mein Herz, oh schieß dich ein”
Reiterlied Op. 145/5: “Der Wald ist schwarz, die Luft ist klar”
Die Mutter An Der Wiege: Schlaf, Holder Knabe, Suss Und Mild!
Der Junggesel: “Ich Bin ein Leichter Junggesel und Wandre Durch Die Welt”
Traumlicht: “Ein Licht Im Traum Hat Mich Besucht”
Bienenweben: “Bienen Summen, Wie Schwer Zu Tragen”
O, Meine Blumen, Ihr Meine Freude!: “O, Meine Blumen, Ihr Meine Fruede!”
Des Bettlers Tochter von Bednall Green: “Erste Abtheilun: Ein Bettelmann, schon lange blind”
Des Bettlers Tochter von Bednall Green: “Zweite Abtheilun: Die Hochzeit festlich zu begehen”
Freibeuter: “Mein Haus hat kein' Thür”
Gesang der Königin Maria Stuart auf den Tod Franz' II
In die Ferne ('Siehst du am Abend die Wolken ziehn')
Brautlied: “Ich will die lauten Freuden nicht”
Die engste Nähe: “Wir hatten einander so gerne”
Frühlingsweihe: “Holder Lenz, mit reichen Gaben schmückst du wieder”
Die schlanke Wasserlilie
Findlay
Nachtlied
Frage nicht!
Das Blümlein
Maiblümelein
Wanderlied
Liebesnähe
Letzter Seufzer
Stille Liebe
Nachtständchen
Die Grabrose
Ida’s Wunsch
Lebewohl
Gute Nacht!
Der Apotheker als Nebenbuhler
Der Liebesscheue
Himmelsblüthen
Schneeglöcken (AKA Blumenballade / Annunciata)
Wechsel ("Auf Kieseln im Bache"),
Brautkranzlied ('Ein Kränzlein sollst du tragen'),
Canzonette, WoO ('War schöner als der schönste Tag')
Hebräische Gesänge
Das Schifflein ('Ein Schifflein ziehet leise'),
An die Muse (O Muse, mir Vertraute du)
Der fünfte Mai (Die Feuerschlünde am Seinestrand)
Salvum fac regem, for a cappella choir
Ewige Liebe (Hauch der Liebe ist das Lüftchen)
Hinaus! Hinauf! Hinab!
Jünglings Gebet
Die Heldenbraut
Auf sich selbst 1
Auf sich selbst 2
An die Leier
Nordisches Seelied

References

External links
List of compositions (in German)

Loewe, Carl